A conclave was convened on 12 March 2013 to elect a pope to succeed Benedict XVI, who had resigned on 28 February. 115 participating cardinal-electors gathered. On the fifth ballot, the conclave elected Cardinal Jorge Mario Bergoglio, SJ, Archbishop of Buenos Aires. He took the pontifical name Francis.

Resignation of Pope Benedict XVI

On 11 February 2013, Benedict XVI announced his resignation from the papacy effective 28 February 2013 at 20:00 local time (19:00 UTC). He was the first pope to resign since Gregory XII in 1415, and the first to do so on his own initiative since Celestine V in 1294.

Speculation
The Los Angeles Times suggested that, though a pope from Latin America was unlikely, with only 19 of 117 cardinal-electors being from Latin America, the region seeks more say in Vatican affairs as it has the world's largest Catholic population. It cited secularism and the rise of Evangelical Protestantism in Latin America detracting from the Catholic faith, along with sex abuse scandals in Mexico, Brazil and Chile as issues important to the region. BBC News said that while the balloting was likely to be hard-fought between different factions for a European or a non-European, an Italian or a non-Italian future pope, the internal differences were unclear, and that many different priorities were at play, making this election exceedingly difficult to predict. Cardinal Cormac Murphy-O'Connor, who was not an elector, remarked laughingly to a BBC presenter that his colleagues have been telling him "Siamo confusi – 'we're confused,'" as there were neither clear blocs nor a front-runner.

One Australian commentator noted that the reform of the administrative machinery of the church, the Roman Curia, was a major issue, as there was no major progressive candidate, and indeed no clear front-runners, in the dynamic between institutional-maintenance and evangelical Catholicism. Giacomo Galeazzi of La Stampa said that "Apparently a sort of tsunami of non-European candidates will fall upon the Roman Curia, and this could take the pontificate far away from Rome, making it more international." Italian Cardinal Francesco Coccopalmerio said: "It's time to look outside Italy and Europe, in particular considering Latin America."

The dossier of the Vatican's own internal investigation into the so-called Vatileaks scandal was called "in effect ... the 118th cardinal inside the conclave". Although the investigating cardinals (none of whom are cardinal electors) are free to discuss the results of their investigation with the participants of the conclave, the dossier itself was to be given by Benedict XVI to his successor.

Cardinal Velasio De Paolis, C.S., said that the presence at the conclave of the former archbishop of Los Angeles, Roger Mahony, would be "troubling" but he also noted that the said cardinal "has the right and duty to take part", and "the rules must be followed". Mahony's successor in Los Angeles, Archbishop José Horacio Gómez, had recently rebuked Mahony for his handling of sex abuse cases, though he too, supported Mahony's participation in the conclave.

Papabili
The conclave cardinals may elect any baptised Catholic male, but since 1271 they have always elected a fellow cardinal. Observers of papal elections tend to consider a few cardinals more likely choices than the others – these are the papabili, the plural for papabile, an Italian word which is practically rendered into English as "pope-able". Inasmuch as the set of papabili is a matter of speculation from the press, the election of a non-papabile is common; recent cases are John XXIII in 1958, John Paul I and John Paul II, both in 1978.

Christoph Schönborn of Austria, Odilo Scherer of Brazil, Luis Antonio Tagle of the Philippines, Peter Turkson of Ghana, Marc Ouellet of Canada, Péter Erdő of Hungary and Angelo Scola of Italy were among the cardinals most often identified in press reports as those most likely to be elected. On 9 March, Cardinal André Vingt-Trois said there were around "half a dozen possible candidates". The next day Cardinal Philippe Barbarin said "There are three, four, maybe a dozen candidates." Jorge Mario Bergoglio of Argentina was seen as a papabile, though less likely to emerge as pope. One summary of likely candidates included him because he was "rumored to be the (weak) second place finisher" at the last conclave, but observed that "his 'moment' seems to be over". In addition, Bergoglio was seen as an older choice: he was 76 at the time of the conclave, and all of the other papabili were younger than he was.

Papal election process

Giovanni Battista Re from Italy, the most senior Cardinal-Bishop participating, presided over the conclave.

Timing and rule change
In 1996, John Paul II in Universi Dominici Gregis fixed the start date of the papal conclave at 15 to 20 days after the papacy becomes vacant. The 2013 conclave was initially expected to start sometime between 15 and 20 March 2013. On 25 February 2013, the Vatican confirmed that Benedict XVI issued the order Normas Nonnullas to allow for a schedule change. This gave the College of Cardinals more latitude, once all of the elector-cardinals were present, to start the conclave earlier or later. They scheduled it to begin 12 March 2013.

The Pope also amended the conclave law to provide for the automatic excommunication of any non-cardinal who breaks the absolute oath of secrecy.

Cardinal electors

There were 207 cardinals on the day the papacy fell vacant. Cardinals aged 80 years or older before the day the papacy fell vacant were ineligible to participate, leaving 117 electors (including Cardinal Walter Kasper, who turned 80 between the papacy becoming vacant and the conclave's start). Two of them were the first cardinal-electors from their churches to participate in a papal conclave: Maronite Patriarch Bechara Boutros al-Rahi and Syro-Malankara Major-Archbishop Baselios Cleemis, the first bishop from the Syro-Malankara Church to be created cardinal.

Two cardinal electors did not attend the conclave. Julius Darmaatmadja, from Indonesia, declined because of the progressive deterioration of his eyesight. Keith O'Brien, the only potential cardinal-elector from Great Britain, had been recently accused of sexual misconduct towards priests in the 1980s and said he did not want his presence to create a distraction. He had resigned as Archbishop of St Andrews and Edinburgh on 18 February 2013 and later apologised for "sexual misconduct".

Preliminary discussions, research and preparations
As soon as Pope Benedict announced his resignation, cardinals began arriving in Rome, and by the day the interregnum formally began, most of them had already arrived. A formal invitation to the conclave was issued on 1 March. The last of the 115 participating cardinal electors to arrive was Cardinal Jean-Baptiste Phạm Minh Mẫn of Ho Chi Minh City, Vietnam, who arrived on 7 March.

Gianfranco Ravasi of the Roman Curia, one of seventeen Cardinal Electors with Twitter accounts, suspended his social media presence on his own initiative at the beginning of the interregnum, while others posted their reactions as they assembled. The College of Cardinals later imposed a pre-conclave media and social media blackout, following leaks to the Italian press, which precluded some American cardinals from holding further press conferences. Some Cardinal Electors researched one another on-line.

The first of several "general congregations" was held on the morning of 4 March to organize the event. The Sistine Chapel was closed to the public on 5 March in preparation for the conclave even before its date was set. To control communication with the outside world during the conclave, a Faraday cage blocking outgoing and incoming communications was installed in the Sistine Chapel area. Contemporary media nevertheless gave journalists and other outsiders unprecedented access to this papal conclave. Approximately 5,600 journalists were accredited to cover the event.

The first congregation (on the morning of 4 March) focused on introductory matters, picking three assistants to the Camerlengo, the recent Synod of Bishops on the New Evangelization, and a suggestion of a message of appreciation to Pope Emeritus Benedict XVI, with 13 cardinals giving speeches (simply in the order they had requested to speak). The second congregation (the evening of 4 March) featured the preaching of the first of two required meditations by Father Raniero Cantalamessa and nine more addresses.

The third congregation was held the morning of 5 March, and featured 11 more addresses (all six continents had by then been represented). The message of appreciation was sent, and the text of the guidelines for the conclave was read. Topics of discussion were: the activities of the Holy See in light of its relations with the world Church's bishops, the course of the Church's renewal after Vatican Council II, and the Church's position in the world, especially regarding the New Evangelization. That evening, the Sistine Chapel closed and the furnaces were installed.

The fourth congregation was held on the morning of 6 March. The Liturgy of the Hours was prayed and three cardinals with birthdays were congratulated, then 18 more speeches (limited to 5 minutes) were given. All but two cardinal-electors were present and had taken the oath. The Church in the world today and the needs of the New Evangelization, the status of the Holy See and of the Roman Curia's dicasteries (its departments: the congregations, the courts, and the pontifical councils, commissions, and academies), relations with bishops, and expectations of a future pope, were discussed. That evening, a prayer service was held at St. Peter's Basilica.

The fifth congregation was held the morning of 7 March. Three new cardinal assistants to the Camerlengo were chosen. A telegram of condolence for the death of Venezuelan president Hugo Chávez was then read. Three separate speeches, each done by one of the three cardinal presidents of the three economic departments of the Holy See, were then given. Then, 13 more speeches were given, especially on ecumenism and the Church's charitable efforts and attention to the poor, in addition to the topics from the previous meeting sessions.

The sixth congregation was scheduled for that evening. Some cardinals from the U.S. had stated in their interviews that the conclave might not begin until well into the following week, wanting the issues to be well discussed (this also gives the non-Italian and non-curial cardinals the benefit of getting to know their Italian and curial counterparts, and especially their other colleagues worldwide, better, which may lessen any disadvantage they may have in voting).

On 7 March, reporters were shown images of preparation work, including the installation of the chimney. Cardinal Phạm Minh Mẫn was able to join the other 114 participating Cardinal Electors for the sixth general congregation the evening of 7 March. Seven more cardinals spoke; all 115 participating Cardinal Electors were present. On 8 March, Lombardi announced that the cardinals would meet later that day and then announce the date for the start of the conclave, which they then set for 12 March. On 8 March,  153 cardinals, including all 115 participating electors, attended the seventh general congregation, where the Cardinal Dean announced that Cardinals Julius Riyadi Darmaatmadja and Keith O'Brien would not be joining the conclave despite being eligible to vote.

Having met the conditions set for beginning the conclave, the cardinals chose Cardinal Prosper Grech to give the meditation at the beginning of the conclave. Eighteen cardinals spoke, bringing the total number of interventions to over 100. In light of International Women's Day, one speech was about the role of women in the Church. Other topics added in this session were: interreligious dialogue, bioethics, the Church's role in promoting justice in the world, collegiality in the Church, and the need for the Church's evangelizers to proclaim the Gospel.

On 11 March, the day before the conclave, the non-cardinal officials, support staff and other non-voting personnel who had duties during the conclave took the oath of secrecy in the presence of Camerlengo Tarcisio Bertone as prescribed in Universi Dominici Gregis as modified by Normas Nonnullas.  Among those taking the oath were the secretary of the College of Cardinals Archbishop Lorenzo Baldisseri and the Master of Pontifical Liturgical Celebrations Monsignor Guido Marini.  Msgr. Marini himself led the oathtakers in reading the oath out loud.  The oath bound them to secrecy on anything they observed during the conclave pertaining to the new pope's election unless explicitly granted special faculty by the new Pope or his successors.  The oath also bound them to refrain from using any audio or visual recording equipment and recording anything pertaining to the papal election during the conclave.  The penalty for breaking the oath was automatic excommunication.  The non-electors took their oath in Italian and in the Pauline Chapel.

Election

Day one
On Tuesday, 12 March 2013, the cardinals present in Rome, both voting and non-voting, gathered in St. Peter's Basilica in the morning for the Pro eligendo Pontifice concelebrated Mass. The Dean of the College of Cardinals, Angelo Sodano was the principal concelebrant and gave the homily. In the afternoon, the 115 cardinal-electors assembled in the Pauline Chapel and walked in procession through the Sala Regia into the Sistine Chapel chanting the Litany of the Saints. After taking their places, the "Veni Creator Spiritus" ("Come, Creator Spirit") was sung. The oath was read aloud by the presiding Cardinal, Giovanni Battista Re, Cardinal Bishop of Sabina-Poggio Mirteto, the most senior Cardinal in attendance. As at the previous conclave, they would swear to observe the norms prescribed by John Paul II's apostolic constitution Universi Dominici Gregis. In addition, they would swear to adhere to the rules prescribed by Benedict XVI in February. Then each cardinal elector in order of seniority placed his hands on the Gospels and made the following affirmation out loud in Latin:

In English:

While making the oath, several Cardinals used the Latin forms of their names. The four cardinals from Eastern Catholic churches were distinguished by their attire. A fifth cardinal, Anthony Olubunmi Okogie of the Latin Church, Archbishop-Emeritus of Lagos, Nigeria did not wear his mozzetta and was seated in a wheelchair through the procession and most of the proceedings but walked accompanied by an assistant and placed his hands on the gospels like the others when making the oath.

Msgr. Guido Marini, Papal Master of Ceremonies, then called out the words "'Extra omnes!"—"Everybody out!"— and the chapel doors were locked to outsiders. Once the doors were closed, the cardinals heard the second required meditation for the conclave, given by Cardinal Grech, who then left the conclave because he was not an elector. After the meditation, one ballot was taken.

Black smoke coming out of the Sistine Chapel's chimney indicated to the outside world, that on this first ballot no candidate had received the required two-thirds of the votes cast. According to several media accounts of the first vote, Scola and Ouellet led with roughly equal numbers of votes, Bergoglio was a close third, and the rest of the votes were scattered among several others. According to La Repubblica, Scola received approximately 35 votes to Bergoglio's 20 and Ouellet's 15, while another account said that Scherer had shown strength. Some cardinals later said that "when they woke up Wednesday morning, it wasn't clear to them they'd have a pope that night, and it was even less clear it would be Bergoglio."

Day two

The two rounds of voting on the morning of 13 March 2013 proved inconclusive and black smoke was again sent out. Scola's candidacy stalled going into Wednesday and votes began to converge around the candidacies of Ouellet and Bergoglio. Sources report that at some point, Ouellet threw his support behind Bergoglio; by the first afternoon ballot—the fourth ballot of the conclave—Bergoglio became the clear front runner. On the fifth ballot, the cardinals, wishing to show a unified front, voted overwhelmingly in favor of Bergoglio, reportedly giving him at least 90 votes with the remaining 25 votes going to other cardinals. Cardinal Seán Brady reported that applause broke out during the tabulation when Bergoglio's count reached the 77 votes required for election.

When Bergoglio was asked if he would accept his election, according to Cardinal Wilfrid Napier OFM, he said, "Although I am a sinner, I accept." He took the name Francis, in honour of St. Francis of Assisi. He later said that while Bergoglio was choosing his papal name, some cardinal-electors jokingly suggested he should choose either "Adrian" after the great reformer Pope Adrian VI, or "Clement" out of revenge against Pope Clement XIV, who suppressed the Jesuit order. At the conclusion of the conclave, Francis gave his cardinal's zucchetto to Archbishop Lorenzo Baldisseri, the non-elector secretary of the conclave.

At 19:06 local time (18:06 UTC), white smoke and the sounding of the bells of St. Peter's Basilica announced that a pope had been chosen and shortly thereafter the Vatican web site was changed to say "Habemus Papam" ("We have a pope").

The Cardinal Protodeacon Jean-Louis Tauran appeared at the central balcony of St. Peter's Basilica and announced the election of the new pope and his chosen name. Pope Francis appeared and asked the people to pray for him before he blessed the world, at which point the conclave concluded.

Post-conclave events
A half-hour later, the Twitter account @Pontifex sent out a tweet that read "HABEMUS PAPAM FRANCISCUM".

At 8:23 pm (20:23) local time, the Italian Conference of Bishops released a statement congratulating Cardinal Angelo Scola of Milan on his election as pope. A corrected statement was released at 9:09 pm (21:09). As cardinals described the voting process, carefully suppressing details so as not to violate their oath of secrecy, one offered this assessment, that "Scola might have won" and "is obviously qualified to be pope", but there was "a very strong bias against the Italians". He added: "There was a sense that the Italians aren't up to the job anymore. They used to be so good, but lately they seem to have lost control of things." Commentators nonetheless noted that the election of Bergoglio was favored by the fact that he was an Italian Argentinian and as such fitting multiple requirements that made him likely to have support from Italian cardinals looking for candidates outside of Europe.

Pope Francis celebrated his inauguration on 19 March and was installed as Bishop of Rome on 7 April.

NSA surveillance speculation
In October 2013, the Italian weekly magazine Panorama claimed that the United States National Security Agency had targeted cardinals in the conclave for surveillance, including Cardinal Bergoglio. An NSA spokesperson denied this.

Notes

References

Further reading 

 
 The political science of papal elections

External links

 
 
 
 Official Vatican website for the Sede Vacante
 Rome conclave begins: Highlights from Sistine Chapel

 
2013
Conclave
2013
papal
papal
papal
papal
Political history of Vatican City